In Arabic onomastics ("nisbah"), al-susi or as-susi denotes a relationship to or from the Sous, Morocco. It may refer to:
Mohammed al-Mokhtar Soussi (1900–1963), Moroccan scholar, politician and writer; author of al-Maʿsul
Muhammad al-Rudani al-Susi al-Maliki al-Maghribi (c. 1627–1683), Moroccan polymath
Muhammad bin al-Hussein as-Sūsī, teacher of  Moroccan Maghrebi script 
Ibn as-Susi, named on the Maymūnah Tombstone

Nisbas